Abbasabad or Abbas Abad may refer to:

Historical places 
 Abbasabad Complex This complex is located 34 kilometers north of Taybad.
 Abbasabad Garden a historical complex of Behshahr in Mazandaran province, Iran.

County 
Abbasabad County s a county on the Caspian Sea, in Mazandaran Province of northern Iran.

Azerbaijan
 Abbasabad, Azerbaijan, a village and municipality in the Yardımlı region of Azerbaijan
 Abbasabad (fortress), Nakhchivan Autonomous Republic

Iran

Alborz Province
 Abbasabad-e Bozorg, a village in Savojbolagh County
 Abbasabad-e Kuchek, a village in Savojbolagh County

Ardabil Province
 Abbasabad, Ardabil, a village in Ardabil County
 Abbasabad-e Bozorg, Ardabil, a village in Parsabad County

Chaharmahal and Bakhtiari Province
 Abbasabad, Ardal, a village in Ardal County

East Azerbaijan Province
 Abbasabad, Heris, a village in Heris County
 Abbasabad, Kaleybar, a village in Kaleybar County
 Abbasabad, Khoda Afarin, a village in Khoda Afarin County
 Abbasabad, Malekan, a village in Malekan County
 Abbasabad, Sarab, a village in Sarab County

Fars Province
Abbasabad, Eqlid, a village in Eqlid County
Abbasabad, Estahban, a village in Estahban County
Abbasabad, Fasa, a village in Fasa County
Abbasabad, Jahrom, a village in Jahrom County
Abbasabad, Khorrambid, a village in Khorrambid County
Abbasabad, Mamasani, a village in Mamasani County
Abbasabad, Marvdasht, a village in Marvdasht County
Abbasabad, Kamfiruz, a village in Marvdasht County
Abbasabad, Seyyedan, a village in Marvdasht County
Abbasabad, Neyriz, a village in Neyriz County
Abbasabad, Sepidan, a village in Sepidan County
Abbasabad, Shiraz, a village in Shiraz County
Abbasabad-e Gazak, a village in Shiraz County

Gilan Province
 Abbasabad, Gilan, a village in Astara County

Golestan Province
 Abbasabad, Aliabad, a village in Aliabad County
 Abbasabad, Aqqala, a village in Aqqala County
 Abbasabad, Gonbad-e Qabus, a village in Gonbad-e Qabus County
 Abbasabad-e Amelak, a village in Minudasht County

Hamadan Province
Abbasabad, Malayer, a village in Malayer County
Abbasabad, alternate name of Abbasiyeh, Hamadan, a village in Malayer County
Abbasabad, Nahavand, a village in Nahavand County

Hormozgan Province
Abbasabad, Rudan, a village in Rudan County

Ilam Province
 Abbasabad, Darreh Shahr, a village in Darreh Shahr County
 Abbasabad, Shirvan and Chardaval, a village in Shirvan and Chardaval County

Isfahan Province
 Abbasabad, Ardestan, a village in Ardestan County
 Abbasabad, Golpayegan, a village in Golpayegan County
 Abbasabad, Isfahan, a village in Isfahan County
 Abbasabad, Kuhpayeh, a village in Isfahan County
 Abbasabad, Kashan, a village in Kashan County
 Abbasabad, Natanz, a village in Natanz County

Kerman Province

Anar County
 Abbasabad, Anar, a village in Anar County

Anbarabad County
 Abbasabad, Anbarabad, a village in Anbarabad County

Arzuiyeh County

Baft County

Bardsir County
 Abbasabad, Bardsir, a village in Bardsir County
 Abbasabad-e Esfak, a village in Bardsir County
 Abbasabad-e Pamzar, a village in Bardsir County

Fahraj County

Faryab County
 Abbasabad, Faryab, a village in Faryab County
 Abbasabad, alternate name of Chah Narenj, Faryab, a village in Faryab County
 Abbasabad, alternate name of Mowtowr-e Abbasabad, a village in Faryab County
 Abbasabad-e Hur, a village in Faryab County
 Abbasabad-e Sargorich, a village in Faryab County

Jiroft County
 Abbasabad, Dowlatabad, a village in Jiroft County
 Abbasabad, Esfandaqeh, a village in Jiroft County

Kerman County

Kuhbanan County
 Abbasabad, Kuhbanan, a village in Kuhbanan County

Manujan County

Narmashir County
 Abbasabad, Narmashir, a village in Narmashir County

Qaleh Ganj County
 Abbasabad, Qaleh Ganj, a village in Qaleh Ganj County
 Abbasabad, Sorkh Qaleh, a village in Qaleh Ganj County

Rafsanjan County
 Abbasabad, Azadegan, a village in Rafsanjan County
 Abbasabad, Eslamiyeh, a village in Rafsanjan County
 Abbasabad, Qasemabad, a village in Rafsanjan County
 Abbasabad-e Amin, a village in Rafsanjan County
 Abbasabad-e Fallah, a village in Rafsanjan County

Ravar County
 Abbasabad, Ravar, a village in Ravar County

Rigan County
 Abbasabad, Rigan, a village in Rigan County
 Abbasabad, Gonbaki, a village in Rigan County
 Abbasabad-e Bahrami, a village in Rigan County
 Abbasabad-e Sardar, a village in Rigan County

Rudbar-e Jonubi County
 Abbasabad Molla Reza, a village in Rudbar-e Jonubi County
 Abbasabad, Jazmurian, a village in Rudbar-e Jonubi County

Shahr-e Babak County
 Abbasabad, Shahr-e Babak, a village in Shahr-e Babak County

Sirjan County
 Abbasabad, Najafabad, a village in Sirjan County
 Abbasabad-e Pisht, a village in Sirjan County

Zarand County
 Abbasabad, Zarand, a village in Zarand County

Kermanshah Province
 Abbasabad, Kangavar, a village in Kangavar County
 Abbasabad-e Kol Kol, a village in Kermanshah County
 Abbasabad-e Seh Choqa, a village in Kermanshah County
 Abbasabad, Sahneh, a village in Sahneh County
 Abbasabad, Sonqor, a village in Sonqor County

Khuzestan Province
 Abbasabad-e Ashrafi, a village in Dezful County
 Abbasabad-e Fakhrai, a village in Dezful County
 Abbasabad, Gotvand, a village in Gotvand County

Kohgiluyeh and Boyer-Ahmad Province
 Abbasabad, Kohgiluyeh and Boyer-Ahmad, a village in Dana County

Kurdistan Province
 Abbasabad, Baneh, a village in Baneh County
 Abbasabad, Bijar, a village in Bijar County
 Abbasabad, Divandarreh, a village in Divandarreh County
 Abbasabad, Kamyaran, a village in Kamyaran County
 Abbasabad, Sanandaj, a village in Sanandaj County
 Abbasabad, Sarvabad, a village in Sarvabad County

Lorestan Province
 Abbasabad, Aligudarz, a village in Aligudarz County
 Abbasabad, Borujerd, a village in Borujerd County
 Abbasabad, Delfan, a village in Delfan County
 Abbasabad, Qaleh-ye Mozaffari, a village in Selseleh County
 Abbasabad, Yusefvand, a village in Selseleh County
 Abbasabad Poshteh, a village in Azna County

Markazi Province
 Abbasabad, Farahan, a village in Farahan County
 Abbasabad, Khomeyn, a village in Khomeyn County
 Abbasabad, alternate name of Qaleh-ye Abbasabad, Khondab, a village in Khondab County
 Abbasabad, alternate name of Qeshlaq-e Abbasabad, a village in Khondab County
 Abbasabad-e Muqufeh, a village in Khondab County
 Abbasabad-e Sanavord, a village in Khondab County
 Abbasabad, Mahallat, a village in Mahallat County
 Abbasabad, Saveh, a village in Saveh County
 Abbasabad, Shazand, a village in Shazand County
 Abbasabad, Kharqan, a village in Zarandieh County
 Abbasabad-e Piazi, a village in Zarandieh County
 Abbasabad-e Qarah Aghaj, a village in Zarandieh County

Mazandaran Province
 Abbasabad, Mazandaran, a city in Abbasabad County
 Abbasabad, Behshahr, a village in Behshahr County
 Abbasabad, Miandorud, a village in Miandorud County
 Abbasabad, Sari, a village in Sari County

North Khorasan Province
 Abbasabad, Esfarayen, a village in Esfarayen County
 Abbasabad, Bam and Safiabad, a village in Esfarayen County
 Abbasabad, Jajrom, a village in Jajrom County

Qazvin Province
 Abbasabad, Buin Zahra, a village in Buin Zahra County
 Abbasabad-e Seyf, a village in Buin Zahra County
 Abbasabad, Qazvin, a village in Qazvin County

Qom Province
 Abbasabad, Qom, a village in Iran

Razavi Khorasan Province
 Abbasabad, Chenaran, a village in Chenaran County
 Abbasabad-e Qandi, a village in Joghatai County
 Abbasabad-e Arab, a village in Jowayin County
 Abbasabad-e Malek, a village in Jowayin County
 Abbasabad, Khoshab, a village in Khoshab County
 Abbasabad, Khvaf, a village in Khvaf County
 Abbasabad, Kenevist, a village in Mashhad County
 Abbasabad, Miyan Velayat, a village in Mashhad County
 Abbasabad, Nishapur, a village in Nishapur County
 Abbasabad-e Faramishan, a village in Rashtkhvar County
 Abbasabad-e Jadid, a village in Rashtkhvar County
 Abbasabad, Taybad, a village in Taybad County
 Abbasabad, Torbat-e Heydarieh, a village in Torbat-e Heydarieh County
 Abbasabad-e Kheyrabad, a village in Torbat-e Jam County

Semnan Province
Abbasabad, Howmeh, a village in Damghan County
Abbasabad, Shahrud, a village in Shahrud County

Sistan and Baluchestan Province
Abbasabad, Iranshahr, a village in Iranshahr County

South Khorasan Province
Abbasabad, Baqeran, a village in Birjand County
Abbasabad, Kahshang, a village in Birjand County
Abbasabad, Bandan, a village in Nehbandan County
Abbasabad, Nehbandan, a village in Nehbandan County
Abbasabad-e Kollab, a village in Nehbandan County
Abbasabad-e Talabi, a village in Nehbandan County
Abbasabad, Qaen, a village in Qaen County
Abbasabad, Nimbeluk, a village in Qaen County
Abbasabad-e Dasht, a village in Qaen County
Abbasabad, Doreh, a village in Sarbisheh County
Abbasabad, Momenabad, a village in Sarbisheh County
Abbasabad, Tabas, a village in Tabas County
Abbasabad, Zirkuh, a village in Zirkuh County

Tehran Province
 Abbasabad, Damavand, a village in Damavand County
 Abbasabad, Pakdasht, a village in Pakdasht County
 Abbasabad, Rey, a village in Rey County
 Abbasabad, Varamin, a village in Varamin County
 Abbasabad-e Alaqeh Band, a village in Rey County
 Abbasabad-e Gol Shaygan, a village in Malard County
 Abbasabad-e Rostamabad, a village in Tehran County
 Abbasabad-e Zargham, a village in Pakdasht County
 Abbas Abad (Tehran), a neighbourhood of Tehran

West Azerbaijan Province
 Abbasabad, Akhtachi-ye Sharqi, a village in Bukan County
 Abbasabad, Behi Dehbokri, a village in Bukan County
 Abbasabad, Sardasht, a village in Sardasht County
 Abbasabad, Urmia, a village in Urmia County

Yazd Province
 Abbasabad (31°02′ N 53°00′ E), Abarkuh, a village in Abarkuh County
 Abbasabad, alternate name of Chah-e Seyyed Jelal Sabz, a village in Khatam County
 Abbasabad, Aliabad, Taft, a village in Taft County

Zanjan Province
 Abbasabad, Zanjan, a village in Abhar County
 Abbasabad-e Olya, Zanjan, a village in Abhar County
 Abbasabad-e Sofla, a village in Abhar County

See also
 Qaleh-ye Abbasabad (disambiguation)